The 1989 European Figure Skating Championships was a senior-level international competition held in Birmingham, England, United Kingdom on January 17–22, 1989. Elite skaters from European ISU member nations competed in the disciplines of men's singles, ladies' singles, pair skating, and ice dancing.

Results

Men
West Germany's Richard Zander won the compulsory figures but withdrew after the short program.

Ladies
Leistner, Conway, Gorbenko were the top three after the compulsory figures. Leistner would go on to win the title while Lebedeva and Neske moved up to take silver and bronze, respectively.

Pairs

Ice dancing
Klimova / Ponomarenko, Usova / Zhulin, and Annenko / Sretenski were the top three after the original set pattern.

References

European Figure Skating Championships, 1989
European Figure Skating Championships, 1989
European Figure Skating Championships
1980s in Birmingham, West Midlands
International figure skating competitions hosted by the United Kingdom
International sports competitions in Birmingham, West Midlands
European Figure Skating Championships